This is a list of day-by-day summaries of the 2018 US Open.

Day 1 (August 27)
 Seeds out:
 Men's Singles:  Grigor Dimitrov [8],  Kyle Edmund [16],  Roberto Bautista Agut [19],  Damir Džumhur [24]
 Women's Singles:  Simona Halep [1],  Anastasia Pavlyuchenkova [27],  Magdaléna Rybáriková [31]
 Schedule of Play

Day 2 (August 28)
 Seeds out:
 Men's Singles:  Marco Cecchinato [22],  Adrian Mannarino [29],  Filip Krajinović [32]
 Women's Singles:  CoCo Vandeweghe [24],  Anett Kontaveit [28]
 Schedule of Play

Day 3 (August 29)
 Seeds out:
 Men's Singles:  Stefanos Tsitsipas [15],  Jack Sock [18]
 Women's Singles:  Julia Görges [9],  Garbiñe Muguruza [12],  Daria Gavrilova [25],  Maria Sakkari [32]
 Men's Doubles:  Oliver Marach /  Mate Pavić [1]
 Women's Doubles:  Nicole Melichar /  Květa Peschke [8],  Alicja Rosolska /  Abigail Spears [12]
 Schedule of Play

Day 4 (August 30)
 Seeds out:
 Men's Singles:  Pablo Carreño Busta [12],  Fabio Fognini [14],  Chung Hyeon [23]
 Women's Singles:  Caroline Wozniacki [2],  Daria Kasatkina [11]
 Men's Doubles:  Ben McLachlan /  Jan-Lennard Struff [12]
 Women's Doubles:  Andreja Klepač /  María José Martínez Sánchez [5],  Vania King /  Katarina Srebotnik [11],  Miyu Kato /  Makoto Ninomiya [16]
 Mixed Doubles:  Chan Hao-ching /  Henri Kontinen [3],  Demi Schuurs /  Matwé Middelkoop [6]
 Schedule of Play

Day 5 (August 31)
 Seeds out:
 Men's Singles:  Karen Khachanov [27],  Denis Shapovalov [28],  Fernando Verdasco [31]
 Women's Singles:  Venus Williams [16],  Barbora Strýcová [23]
 Men's Doubles:  Jean-Julien Rojer /  Horia Tecău [6],  Raven Klaasen /  Michael Venus [8],  Feliciano López /  Marc López [10],  Julio Peralta /  Horacio Zeballos [13]
 Women's Doubles:  Kiki Bertens /  Johanna Larsson [9],  Chan Hao-ching /  Yang Zhaoxuan [10],  Irina-Camelia Begu /  Monica Niculescu [15]
 Schedule of Play

Day 6 (September 1)
 Seeds out:
 Men's Singles:  Alexander Zverev [4],  Diego Schwartzman [13],  Lucas Pouille [17],  Richard Gasquet [26],  Nick Kyrgios [30]
 Women's Singles:  Angelique Kerber [4],  Petra Kvitová [5],  Caroline Garcia [6],  Jeļena Ostapenko [10],  Kiki Bertens [13]
 Men's Doubles:  Henri Kontinen /  John Peers [2]
 Women's Doubles:  Gabriela Dabrowski /  Xu Yifan [4]
 Mixed Doubles:  Gabriela Dabrowski /  Mate Pavić [1]
 Schedule of Play

Day 7 (September 2)
 Seeds out:
 Men's Singles:  Kevin Anderson [5],  Borna Ćorić [20],  Milos Raonic [25]
 Women's Singles:  Elina Svitolina [7],  Elise Mertens [15],  Ashleigh Barty [18]
 Men's Doubles:  Pierre-Hugues Herbert /  Nicolas Mahut [9]
 Women's Doubles:  Raquel Atawo /  Anna-Lena Grönefeld [14]
 Mixed Doubles:  Latisha Chan /  Ivan Dodig [4] (Withdrew),  Katarina Srebotnik /  Michael Venus [7],  Abigail Spears /  Juan Sebastián Cabal [8]
 Schedule of Play

Day 8 (September 3)
 Seeds out:
 Men's Singles:  Roger Federer [2],  David Goffin [10]
 Women's Singles:  Maria Sharapova [22],  Aryna Sabalenka [26],  Dominika Cibulková [29]
 Men's Doubles:  Ivan Dodig /  Marcel Granollers [11],  Robin Haase /  Matwé Middelkoop [14],  Dominic Inglot /  Franko Škugor  [16]
 Women's Doubles:  Andrea Sestini Hlaváčková /  Barbora Strýcová [3]
 Mixed Doubles:  Nicole Melichar /  Oliver Marach [2]
 Schedule of Play

Day 9 (September 4)
 Seeds out:
 Men's Singles:  Dominic Thiem [9],  John Isner [11]
 Women's Singles:  Sloane Stephens [3],  Karolína Plíšková [8]
 Men's Doubles:  Rohan Bopanna /  Édouard Roger-Vasselin [15]
 Women's Doubles:  Lucie Hradecká /  Ekaterina Makarova [6]
 Mixed Doubles:  Andrea Sestini Hlaváčková /  Édouard Roger-Vasselin [5]
 Schedule of Play

Day 10 (September 5)
 Seeds out:
 Men's Singles:  Marin Čilić [7]
 Women's Singles:  Carla Suárez Navarro [30]
 Men's Doubles:  Jamie Murray /  Bruno Soares [4]
 Women's Doubles:  Elise Mertens /  Demi Schuurs [7]
 Schedule of Play

Day 11 (September 6)
 Seeds out:
 Women's Singles:  Madison Keys [14],  Anastasija Sevastova [19]
 Men's Doubles:  Juan Sebastián Cabal /  Robert Farah [5]
 Women's Doubles:  Barbora Krejčíková /  Kateřina Siniaková [1]
 Schedule of Play

Day 12 (September 7)
 Seeds out:
 Men's Singles:  Rafael Nadal [1],  Kei Nishikori [21]
 Men's Doubles:  Łukasz Kubot /  Marcelo Melo [7]
 Schedule of Play

Day 13 (September 8)

Serena Williams was attempting to equal Margaret Court's record of 24 Grand Slam titles and was also attempting to set new Open Era records to have a seventh US Open title, to surpass Chris Evert's record of six titles.
 Seeds out:
 Women's Singles:  Serena Williams [17]
 Schedule of Play

Day 14 (September 9)
 Seeds out:
 Men's Singles:  Juan Martín del Potro [3]
 Women's Doubles:  Tímea Babos /  Kristina Mladenovic [2] 
 Schedule of Play

References

Day-by-day summaries
US Open (tennis) by year – Day-by-day summaries